Foxmoor Casuals (founded as Foxwood Casuals) was a chain of mall-based women's clothing stores in the US, from 1963 until 1990.

History 
Foxwood Casuals was founded in 1963, in Pittsburgh, Pennsylvania. The then 16-store chain was acquired by the Melville Shoe Corporation in late 1968. By 1982, the chain had expanded greatly to a total of 588 stores with sales of $196 million, now renamed to Foxmoor Casuals. In 1984, the chain was sold to the Canadian-based Dylex Limited who paid $49 million (CAD) for the then 614-unit chain. In January 1990, the chain, operated through Dylex subsidiary Foxmoor Specialty Stores Corp., filed for Chapter 11 bankruptcy, selling 225 stores to the Edison Brothers conglomerate and liquidating the remaining stores. The 225 stores bought by Edison Brothers were quickly converted to other nameplates that year.

References 

.

Defunct clothing retailers of the United States
American companies disestablished in 1990
Defunct companies based in Pennsylvania
1990 disestablishments in Pennsylvania
Retail companies disestablished in 1990
Companies that filed for Chapter 11 bankruptcy in 1990
1963 establishments in Pennsylvania
American companies established in 1963
Retail companies established in 1963